Dmitry Tursunov was the defending champion, but chose not to participate that year.

Jo-Wilfried Tsonga won in the final 7–6(7–4), 6–4, against Novak Djokovic.

Seeds
The top four seeds receive a bye into the second round.

Draw

Finals

Top half

Bottom half

External links
 Draw
 Qualifying draw

Singles